Nagardeola Budruk is a village in Pachora tehsil of Jalgaon district in the Maharashtra state, India.

Demographics
Nagardeola is one of the largest villages in the Jalgaon district.  At the 2011 census, Nagardeola had a population of 14,229 in 2,872 households: 7,433 males and 6,796 females.

References 

Cities and towns in Jalgaon district